Minuscule 883 (in the Gregory-Aland numbering), Θε55 (von Soden), is a 15th-century Greek minuscule manuscript of the New Testament on paper. It has not complex contents.

Description 

The codex contains the text of the Gospel of John, with a commentary, on 181 paper leaves (size ), with lacuna in John 21:19-25. The text is written in one column per page, 24 lines per page.
The commentary is of Theophylact of Ohrid.

Text 
The Greek text of the codex Kurt Aland did not place it in any Category.

History 

According to F. H. A. Scrivener and C. R. Gregory it was written in the 15th century. Currently the manuscript is dated by the INTF to the 15th century.

The manuscript was added to the list of New Testament manuscripts by Scrivener (714e), Gregory (883e). Gregory saw it in 1886.

Currently the manuscript is housed at the Vatican Library (Palat. gr. 208), in Rome.

See also 

 List of New Testament minuscules (1–1000)
 Biblical manuscript
 Textual criticism
 Minuscule 882

References

Further reading

External links 
 

Greek New Testament minuscules
15th-century biblical manuscripts
Manuscripts of the Vatican Library